Kazakhstan competed at the 2018 Winter Olympics in PyeongChang, South Korea, from 9 to 25 February 2018.

On January 9, 2018, short track speed skater Abzal Azhgaliyev was named as the country's flag bearer during the opening ceremony.

Medalists 

|align="left" valign="top"|

Competitors 
The following is the list of number of competitors participating at the Games per sport/discipline.

Alpine skiing 

Kazakhstan qualified one male and one female athlete.

Biathlon 

Based on their Nations Cup rankings in the 2016–17 Biathlon World Cup, Kazakhstan qualified a team of 5 men and 5 women.
Men

Women

Mixed

Cross-country skiing 

Kazakhstan qualified a total of 6 male and female athletes for cross-country skiing and received one additional quota place based on the reallocation process. Four male and three female competitors were announced on January 29.

Distance
Men

Women

Sprint

Figure skating 

Kazakhstan qualified one male and two female figure skaters, based on its placement at the 2017 World Figure Skating Championships in Helsinki, Finland.

Freestyle skiing 

Aerials

Moguls

Luge

Short track speed skating

According to the ISU Special Olympic Qualification Rankings, Kazakhstan qualified 3 men and 2 women. During reallocation process got 2 additional quotas: 1 quota for 1500 meters men's event and 1 quota for men's relay.

Men

Women

Ski jumping 

Kazakhstan qualified one ski jumper.

Speed skating 

Individual

Mass start

See also
Kazakhstan at the 2017 Asian Winter Games

Kazakhstan at the 2017 Winter Universiade

References

Nations at the 2018 Winter Olympics
2018
2018 in Kazakhstani sport